The 1998–99 FC Bayern Munich season was the 99th season in the club's history.

Review and events
Bayern Munich played in the dramatic 1999 UEFA Champions League Final against Manchester United. Bayern Munich dominated the match, taking the lead through a Mario Basler free-kick and hitting the woodwork twice, before United substitutes Teddy Sheringham and Ole Gunnar Solskjær scored in injury time to win the treble for the English side.

Matches

Legend

Bundesliga

Results by round

Ligapokal

DFB-Pokal

UEFA Champions League

Second qualifying round

Group stage

Knockout rounds

Quarter-finals

Semi-finals

Final

Squad

Squad, appearances and goals 

|-
|colspan="12"|Players sold or loaned out after the start of the season:

|}

Goals

Bookings

Transfers and loans

Transfers in

Total spending:  €7,600,000

Transfers out

Total income:  €8,675,000

Team Kit

References

Bayern Munich
FC Bayern Munich seasons
German football championship-winning seasons